'''Dindiri is a settlement village in Kilifi county within Kilifi South Constituency and Chasimba Ward. Its native occupants are the Chonyi, a sub tribe of the large Mijikenda. Its major economic activities are substance agriculture of maize, Beans, Peas, Cassava, Rice, watermelon etc. With a population of approx.4300 it has one public primary school, and one Day Secondary School with no health facility, no vocational centre nor an administration centre.Kenya's Kilifi County.

References 

Populated places in Coast Province
Kilifi County